Deglobalization or deglobalisation is the process of diminishing interdependence and integration between certain units around the world, typically nation-states. It is widely used to describe the periods of history when economic trade and investment between countries decline. It stands in contrast to globalization, in which units become increasingly integrated over time, and generally spans the time between periods of globalization. While globalization and deglobalization are antitheses, they are not mirror images.

The term of deglobalization has derived from some of the very profound change in many developed nations, where trade as a proportion of total economic activity until the 1970s was below previous peak levels in the early 1910s. This decline reflects that their economies become less integrated with the rest of the world economies in spite of the deepening scope of economic globalization. At the  global level only two longer periods of deglobalization occurred, namely in the 1930s during the Great Depression and 2010s, when following the Great Trade Collapse the period of the World Trade Slowdown set in. 
 
The occurrence of deglobalization has strong proponents who have claimed the death of globalization, but is also contested by the former Director-General of the World Trade Organization Pascal Lamy and leading academics such as Michael Bordo  who argue that it is too soon to give a good diagnosis and Mervyn Martin  who argues that US and UK policies are rational answers to essential temporary problems of even strong nations

While as with globalization, deglobalization can refer to economic, trade, social, technological, cultural and political dimensions, much of the work that has been conducted in the study of deglobalization refers to the field of international economics.

1930s versus 2010s 

Periods of deglobalization have mainly been seen as interesting comparators to other periods, such as 1850–1914 and 1950–2007, in which globalization had been the norm, given that globalization is the norm for most people and because the interpretation of the global economy has mainly been framed as inevitably increasing integration. Therefore, even periods of stagnant international interaction are often wrongly seen as periods of deglobalization. Recently, scientists have started to also compare the major periods of deglobalization in order to better understand drivers and consequences of this phenomenon.

The two major phases of deglobalisation are not identical twins. The two phases of deglobalisation were equally triggered by a demand shock in the wake of a financial crisis. Both in the 1930s and in the 2000s the composition of trade was a second key determinant: manufacturing trade bore the brunt of the contraction. One important finding is that country experiences both during the Great Depression and Great Recession are very heterogeneous so that one-size-fits-all policies to counter negative impacts of deglobalization are inappropriate. In the 1930s, democracies supported free trade, and deglobalisation was driven by autocratic decisions to strengthen self-sufficiency. In the 2010s, political institutions are just as significant, but now democratic decisions such as the election of President Trump with an America First agenda and Brexit drive the deglobalisation process worldwide. Indeed, while the industrialised countries in the 2010s avoided the pitfalls of protectionism and deflation, they have experienced different political dynamics.

Measures of deglobalization 
As with globalization, economic deglobalization can be measured in different ways. These centre around the four main economic flows:
 Goods and services, e.g. exports plus imports as a proportion of national income or per head of population.
 Labour/people, e.g. net migration rates; inward or outward migration flows, weighted by population (and resultant remittances in per cent of GDP)
 Capital, e.g. inward or outward direct investment as a proportion of national income or per head of population
It is generally not thought possible to measure deglobalization through lack of flows of technology, the fourth main flow. 
Those areas that are measurable do suggest other possible measures, including:
 Average tariffs
 Border restrictions on labour
 Capital controls, including restrictions on foreign direct investment or outward direct investment

The multi-dimensional globalization index of KOF Swiss Economic Institute shows a clear break for economic globalization in 2009 in 2015 KOF observed for its overall index: "The level of globalisation worldwide increased rapidly between 1990 and 2007 and has risen only slightly since the Great Recession. In 2015, globalisation decreased for the first time since 1975. The fall was due to the decline in economic globalisation, with social globalisation stagnating and political globalisation increasing slightly."
Other indicators of deglobalization include the development of Foreign Direct Investment, that according to UNCTAD slipped further in 2017 and in stark contrast with production.

Risks of deglobalization
Typically a reduction of the level of international integration of economies and the world economy at large are expected to exert second round effects related to four feedback mechanisms:
 A reduction of (the rate of growth) of international trade will feed negatively into long-run growth.
 A loss of interaction, the co-movement of economies.
 Trade policy feedbacks in the sense that reduced international interaction and lower growth will stimulate protectionism and non-economic issue areas where reduced cooperation among countries and even an increasing risk of international conflict can be expected.

International political economy of deglobalization 
Deglobalization has also been used as a political agenda item or a term in framing the debate on a new World economic order, for example by Walden Bello in his 2005 book Deglobalization.
One of the prominent examples of deglobalization movement could be found in the United States of America, where the Bush and Obama administration instituted Buy American Act clause as party of massive stimulus package, which was designed to favor American-made goods over traded goods. Likewise, the EU has imposed new subsidies to protect their agricultural sectors for their own protection. These movements of deglobalization can be seen as the example of how developed nations react to the Financial crisis of 2007–08 through deglobalization movements.
Recently a change in the pattern of anti-globalism has been observed: anti-globalism now has a strong foothold in the Global North and among right-wing (conservative) politicians, with much different attitudes in the Global South, particular among the BRICS countries.

See also 
 I'm Backing Britain
 Trade-to-GDP ratio

References

Cultural geography
Economic geography
Globalization
World government